Ronald Douglas Montrose (November 29, 1947 – March 3, 2012) was an American guitarist who founded and led the rock bands Montrose and Gamma. He also performed and did session work with a variety of musicians, including Van Morrison, Herbie Hancock, Beaver & Krause, Boz Scaggs, Edgar Winter, Gary Wright, The Beau Brummels, Dan Hartman, Tony Williams, The Neville Brothers, Marc Bonilla and Sammy Hagar. 

Montrose's 1973 debut album has often been cited as "America's answer to Led Zeppelin". Ronnie Montrose is often recognized as one of the most influential guitarists in early hard rock.

Career 

Montrose was born in San Francisco. When he was a toddler, his parents moved back to his mother's home state of Colorado (his father was from Bertrand, Nebraska, and his mother was from Golden, Colorado). He spent most of his younger years in Denver until he ran away at about 16 years old to pursue his musical career. Ultimately he spent most of his life in the San Francisco Bay area.

In 1969, he started out in a band called 'Sawbuck' with Mojo Collins (lead vocals, guitar), Starr Donaldson (guitar, vocals), Chuck Ruff (drums) and Bill Church (bass). They were signed to Fillmore Records, co-owned by producer David Rubinson and promoter Bill Graham, and toured and opened for major acts. At the end of 1970 and beginning of '71, they were recording their first and only album, Sawbuck. During this time, Rubinson had arranged an audition for Montrose with Van Morrison. Morrison, having recently moved from New York to California, needed a new band to record his next album Tupelo Honey. Both Montrose and Church left Sawbuck to join Morrison, but both did appear on two songs on the Sawbuck album which was released in 1972. Montrose and Church also played on the song "Listen to the Lion", recorded during the Tupelo Honey sessions and released on Morrison's next album Saint Dominic's Preview (1972).

Montrose played briefly with Boz Scaggs before joining the Edgar Winter Group in 1972. Montrose then recruited Chuck Ruff,  which essentially ended the band Sawbuck. For Winter's third album release, They Only Come Out at Night (1972), which included the hit singles "Frankenstein" and "Free Ride", Montrose recorded electric guitar, acoustic 12-string, and mandolin.

Montrose formed his own band, Montrose, in 1973. It featured Sammy Hagar on vocals. That incarnation of the band released two albums on Warner Bros. Records, Montrose (1973) and Paper Money (1974), before Hagar left to pursue a solo career. Although the liner notes for the CD edition of Paper Money said that Montrose was invited to play lead guitar for Mott the Hoople after he left the Edgar Winter Group, Montrose said that it never happened and was just a rumor. He also added his guitar work to Gary Wright's song, "Power of Love" off the 1975 album, The Dream Weaver.

The guitarist released two more Montrose band albums in the rock/vocal format (Warner Bros. Presents Montrose! (1975) and Jump on It (1976), featuring vocalist Bob James replacing Sammy Hagar and adding Jim Alcivar on keyboards. Montrose then shifted direction and released a solo album, the all-instrumental Open Fire (1978) with Edgar Winter producing.

In 1979, Montrose formed Gamma with vocalist Davey Pattison at the recommendation of fellow Scotsman James Dewar bassist/vocalist for Robin Trower. Jim Alcivar appears on his fourth Ronnie Montrose project in a row and bassist Alan Fitzgerald returns as well with drummer Skip Gillette. Gamma had more of a progressive rock edge as compared to the Montrose band and initially produced three consecutive albums. The rhythm section was replaced by Montrose drummer Denny Carmassi and bassist Glenn Letsch with Gamma 2. Gamma 3 saw Alcivar replaced by Mitchell Froom on keyboards.

In 1983 Montrose played lead guitar on the song "(She Is a) Telepath" from Paul Kantner's album Planet Earth Rock and Roll Orchestra although he wasn't a member of the original PERRO.

In 1985 he joined Seattle's Rail (winners of MTV's first Basement Tapes video competition) for several months. He was looking for a new band and one of Rail's guitarists, Rick Knotts had recently left. Billed as 'Rail featuring Montrose' or 'Ronnie & Rail', they played a set of half Rail favorites and half Montrose songs ("Rock Candy", "Rock the Nation", "Matriarch" and Gamma's remake of Thunderclap Newman's "Something in the Air"). At the end of the tour, there was an amicable split.

He continued to record through the 1980s and 1990s, releasing solo albums including The Speed of Sound (1988), Music from Here (1994), and Bearings (2000), as well as another Montrose album titled Mean (1987) and a fourth Gamma album Gamma 4 (2000).

Montrose appeared on Sammy Hagar's solo album Marching to Mars (1997) along with original Montrose members bassist Bill Church and drummer Denny Carmassi on the song "Leaving the Warmth of the Womb". The original Montrose lineup also reformed to play as a special guest at several Sammy Hagar concerts in summer 2004 and 2005. Montrose also performed regularly from 2001 until 2011 with a Montrose lineup featuring Keith St. John on lead vocals and a rotating cast of veteran hard rock players on bass and drums. In 2011, Montrose formed the 'Ronnie Montrose Band' with Randy Scoles on vocals, Dan McNay on bass, and Steve Brown on drums, playing music from his entire career, including both Montrose and Gamma songs. This lineup was captured in his final released work, the concert DVD Ronnie Montrose: Live at the Uptown.

During his 2009 tour, Montrose revealed that he had fought prostate cancer for the previous two years but was healthy once again; he continued to tour until his death in 2012.

Death 
Montrose died from a self-inflicted gunshot wound on March 3, 2012. His death was originally assumed to be the result of his prostate cancer.
However, the San Mateo County Coroner's Office released a report that confirmed the guitarist had shot himself.

The toxicology reported a blood alcohol content of 0.31 percent at the time of death. In early 2012, the deaths of his uncle and of Lola, his bulldog, worsened what Guitar Player magazine called a "clinical depression that plagued him since he was a toddler."

Montrose was survived by his wife, two children and five grandchildren.

Discography

Solo albums 
 Open Fire (1978)
 Territory (1986)
 The Speed of Sound (1988)
 The Diva Station (1990)
 Mutatis Mutandis (1991)
 Music from Here (1994)
 Mr. Bones (video game soundtrack) (1996)
 Roll Over and Play Live (Live album) (1999)
 Bearings (1999)
 10x10 (2017)

with Montrose 
 Montrose (1973)
 Paper Money (1974)
 Warner Brothers Presents Montrose! (1975)
 Jump on It (1976)
 Mean (1987)
 The Very Best of Montrose (2000)

with Gamma 
 Gamma 1 (1979)
 Gamma 2 (1980)
 Gamma 3 (1982)
 The Best of Gamma (1992)
 Gamma 4 (2000)

Session work 
 Herbie Hancock – Mwandishi (1971) "Ostinato (Suite for Angela)"
 Victoria (Domalgoski) – Victoria (1971) "Song About the Sun", "We've Got Ways to Keep High" with Herbie Hancock
 Beaver & Krause – Gandharva (1971) "Saga of the Blue Beaver"
 Van Morrison – Tupelo Honey (1971)
 Van Morrison – The Philosopher's Stone (1971) "Ordinary People" & "Wonderful Remark" [compilation released 1999]
 Kendell Kardt – Buddy Bolden (unreleased solo LP 1971) "Buddy Bolden" & "Black Train"  with Jerry Garcia
 Boz Scaggs – Unreleased Muscle Shoals tapes (1971)
 Sawbuck – Sawbuck (1972) "Believe" and "Lovin' Man"
 Van Morrison – Saint Dominic's Preview (1972) "Listen to the Lion" – recorded 1971 during Tupelo Honey sessions
 Edgar Winter Group – They Only Come Out at Night (1972)
 Kathi McDonald – Insane Asylum (1973) "(Love Is Like a) Heat Wave", "Heartbreak Hotel" & "If You Need Me"
 Gary Wright – The Dream Weaver (1975) "Power of Love"
 The Beau Brummels – The Beau Brummels (1975) "Down to the Bottom"
 Dan Hartman – Images (1976) "The Party's in the Back Room" & "High Sign"
 Hoodoo Rhythm Devils – Safe in Their Homes (1976) "Safe in Their Homes" & "Teach Your Daughter"
 Tony Williams – The Joy of Flying (1978) "Open Fire"
 Nicolette Larson – In the Nick of Time (1979) "Just in the Nick of Time"
 Lauren Wood – Lauren Wood (1979) "Dirty Work" (Steely Dan cover)
 Earth Quake – Two Years in a Padded Cell (1979) "Trouble"
 Jamie Sheriff – No Heroes (1980) "Soldier"
 Paul Kantner – Planet Earth Rock and Roll Orchestra (1983) "(She Is a) Telepath"
 The Neville Brothers – Uptown (1987) "Whatever It Takes"
 Various Artists – Guitar Speak (1988) "Blood Alley 152"
 Heist – High Heel Heaven (1989) "She Needs Love", "Tighter"
 Various Artists – Born to Ski soundtrack (1991) "Born to Ski"
 Marc Bonilla – EE Ticket (1991) "Razorback"
 Marc Bonilla – American Matador (1993) "I Am the Walrus" (instrumental cover)
 Anti-M – Positively Negative (1995) "Security", "Television", "Lonely" and "Iniki"
 Glenn Hughes – Addiction (1996) "Justified Man"
 Edgar Winter – The Real Deal (1996) "Eye of the Storm"
 Kevin Crider  – Signatures (1996) "Stratovision"
 Sammy Hagar – Marching to Mars (1997) "Leaving the Warmth of the Womb"
 C.J. Hutchins – Out of These Hands (1998) "Cannonball" (bass), "Cross-Leg", "Rock Me to Sleep", "Out of These Hands", "What Went Wrong" (bass) & "Circus Song"
 David Culiner – Implode (1999) "Human Shield"
 Jerry Jennings – Shortcut to the Center (1999) [Released in 2005] "Observation" (acoustic), "One Blue Lady" (lead)
 Bruce Turgon – Outside Looking in (2005) "Outside Looking in"
 Various Artists – The Songs of Pink Floyd (2002) & Back Against the Wall (2005) "Another Brick in the Wall (Pt. 2)"
 Various Artists – Secondhand Smoke – A Tribute to Frank Marino (2005) "Try for Freedom"

Production 
 Mitchell Froom – Key of Cool (1984)
 Jeff Berlin / Vox Humana – Champion (1985) background vocals
 Wrath – Nothing to Fear (1987)
 Heathen – Breaking the Silence (1987)
 C.J. Hutchins – Out of These Hands (1998) guitar, bass
 Jerry Jennings – Shortcut to the Center (1999) [Released in 2005]
 Y&T – Unearthed, Vol. 2 (2005) composer

References

External links 
 Ronnie Montrose website
 Ronnie Montrose info page

1947 births
2012 suicides
American heavy metal guitarists
Guitarists from San Francisco
Lead guitarists
Slide guitarists
Montrose (band) members
Suicides by firearm in California
20th-century American guitarists
Gamma (band) members
2012 deaths